= Rosofia Lia =

Hong Kong bodybuilder

- 魏楚燕 (‘’Wei Chu Yan’’)
- Born: May 19, 1994 (age 31)
- Occupation: Bodybuilder
- Known for: IFBB champion

Rosofia Lia (born Wei Chu Yan; May 19, 1994 – ）is the youngest IFBB (International Federation of Bodybuilding and Fitness) professional in Asia (as of 2017) and the first woman in Hong Kong to attain that level of bodybuilding.

== History ==
Lia was a professional dancer before turning to bodybuilding; after returning from a dance competition in Germany in 2015, she turned her attention to bodybuilding. She noted during a 2017 interview that she was one of the few women in Hong Kong that participated in the sport, explaining it was “very lonely” to be one of the few women in the gym lifting weights.

Lia won a local championship and the Mr. Olympia Amateur Asia Hong Kong Championship in 2016, and also winning the overall championship in the Bikini Bodybuilding category. She qualified for the International Bodybuilding Association (IFBB) in March 2018, attending her first competition in Hawaii that year.

She has also been a guest host on the RTHK program “RTHK Sports 123”.

== Personal life ==
Lia was born in 1994, of mixed Hong Kong and Italian heritage (her father is Italian, her mother is from Hong Kong). She has five sisters.

She has faced criticism when working out, some asking her “why she wants to look like a man”. She chose to be self-affirming, showing others the positive aspects of working out. As of 2024, Lia was coaching other bodybuilders in Hong Kong.
